The term microgame can refer to several subjects including:
MicroGame, line of board games by Metagaming Concepts
Microgame (board games), type of board game or wargame
Microgame (company), Italian gambling company
Micronesian Games, international multi-sport event
Wario (series)#Microgames, minigames in the WarioWare series
WarioWare, Inc.: Mega Microgames!, 2003 Nintendo video game

See also
Minigame